The Banda Arc (main arc, Inner, and Outer) is a dual chain of islands in eastern Indonesia. It is the result of the collision of a continent and an intra-oceanic island arc. The presently active volcanic arc is mounted on stretched continental and oceanic crust whereas the associated subduction trench is underlain by continental crust, which has subducted deep enough to contaminate the volcanic arc with continental melts. The convergence of the Indo-Australian plates and Eurasia resulted in the formation of the Sunda and Banda island arcs. The transitional zone between the arcs is located south of Flores Island and is characterized by the change in the tectonic regime along the boundary. in the Timor Region.

Terminology 
Some academic literature refers to the arcs by location – so that the main arc can be referred to as the 'southern', the 'western'  Situated at the centre of three converging and colliding major tectonic plates, Indo-Australia, Eurasia, Pacific, the Banda arc includes young oceanic crust enclosed by a volcanic inner arc, outer arc islands and a trough parallel to the Australian continental margin.

Inner and outer arcs 

The Banda Arc is a double island arc formed by the collision of the Indo-Australian plate with the Eurasian plate. Principal islands include Timor, Flores, and Seram.
 The Inner Banda Arc consists of a string of recent and active volcanic islands from Komodo to Kekeh-besar of the Barat Daya Islands, including Flores, Solor, Alor, Wetar, and Damar.
 The Outer Banda Arc consists of an accretionary wedge of Australian continental margin cover units that were scrapped off the Australian plate and added to the southern edge of the Asian plate. The Banda arc-continent collision is still active and converging at a rate of 7 cm/a. It stretches from Savu through Rote, Timor, Leti, Babar, Tanimbar, and the Kai Islands, before turning west to Seram, Ambon, and Buru. The outer arc is geologically associated with the Australian continent, though it is a more recent accretion than the neighbouring Aru Islands.

Geographically, it stretches across eastern Indonesia, and is delimited by an active inner volcanic arc. The outer arc contains numerous islands, and its internal geologic structure contains young oceanic crust exclusively.

See also 

 Banda Sea Plate
 Islands of Indonesia
 Oceanic trench
 Plate tectonic
 Sunda Arc
 Sunda Islands
 Greater Sunda Islands
 Lesser Sunda Islands
 Sundaland
 Sunda Trench

References 

 

 

Plate tectonics
Island arcs
Archipelagoes of Indonesia
Arcs of Indonesia